The Greater Vancouver Board of Trade (GVBOT) is a non-profit organization. It serves Vancouver, British Columbia, Canada, in a fashion similar to the Board of Trade or Chamber of Commerce. The Board is the largest business association between Victoria and Toronto, participating in activities such as engaging in advocacy to impact public policy at all levels of government, facilitating networking opportunities, and providing professional development resources for its members.

Role in Local Governance 

The Greater Vancouver Board of Trade has been vested by federal and provincial governments with the power to select board members for a number of local governance bodies and institutions. The Board of Trade selects one of the five members of the Screening Panel that shortlists candidates for TransLink's Board of Directors and is also involved in selecting directors for Port Metro Vancouver and the Vancouver Airport Authority.

History 
The Greater Vancouver Board of Trade was established on 22 September 1887, to help rebuild after the Great Vancouver Fire destroyed the city. 31 men - composed of merchants, lumbermen, bankers and manufacturers - founded the Board of Trade to "protect the interests of merchants, traders and manufacturers, to advance the trade of the area and to promote the advancement and general prosperity of Vancouver." In addition to lower taxes, early lobbying efforts pushed for the construction of schools, a land registry office, a court house, a submarine communications cable to Australia (completed in 1902) and the establishment of mail delivery.

By 1952, the Board had grown to ten bureaus and ten standing committees which worked on campaigns, exhibitions, luncheons, educational products, endorsements and representations to all levels of government on behalf of the business community.

In 1983, the Board became a member of the World Trade Centers Association and in 1986 moved into the Vancouver World Trade Centre office complex at Canada Place. It hosted the General Assembly of the World Trade Centers Association the same year.

At the time, Canada's $363 billion debt was climbing at a rate of $53,300 per minute. In 1998, Finance Minister Paul Martin hit the gong and stopped the clock at a special Board of Trade luncheon. The board's debt clock stopped just shy of $600 billion.

In more recent years, The Greater Vancouver Board of Trade was one of the leading voices to support Vancouver's bid for the 2010 Olympic Games – hosting workshops and forums to promote the bid, and even flying in a pre-bid countdown clock to Canada Place by helicopter. The Board also successfully lobbied for a revote of the Translink mayors' council to save the Richmond-Airport-Vancouver rapid transit line – known today as the SkyTrain's Canada Line, and was a founding member of the Fair Tax Coalition, which helped the city to approve a one-per-cent reduction in business property taxes. 

The Board has also hosted numerous events with influential public figures and politicians, including former President Barack Obama, former First Lady Michelle Obama, Prime Minister Justin Trudeau, and Deputy Prime Minister and Finance Minister Chrystia Freeland.

Milestones

Events
The Greater Vancouver Board of Trade hosts more than 150 events each year with more than 75 of those featuring business leaders, dignitaries and other people from around the world. The Board hosts 50 members-only events every year, including 30 complimentary events, most of which are specifically designed as networking opportunities:

Networking Roundtables and Members' Orientations - events where members can present their products and services.

Programs
The Greater Vancouver Board of Trade runs a variety of programs, including many symposiums, exclusive networking events and community fundraisers, in addition to programs like The Spirit of Vancouver, Leaders of Tomorrow and the Company of Young Professionals.

Leaders of Tomorrow
Leaders of Tomorrow (LOT) is a mentorship program, created by the Greater Vancouver Board of Trade. The program selects 100 students in their final year from accredited Lower Mainland post-secondary educational institutions.

Company of Young Professionals
The Company of Young Professionals (CYP) is a leadership development program designed for young professionals under the age of 32. Members can attend Board of Trade events at discounted rates and can be involved in the program for up to three years.

Diversity and Inclusion Leadership Council 
The Diversity and Inclusion Leadership Council (DLC), an evolution of the Women’s Leadership Council program, is an inclusive program that champions and advocates for leadership that best reflects the diversity of the Greater Vancouver region.

Scale-Up Centre for SMEs 
The Scale-Up Centre for SMEs (SCS) provides a series of curated program offerings to help high-potential small to medium firms from various sectors overcome barriers to continued growth and elevate their growth trajectories.

World Trade Centre Vancouver
World Trade Centre Vancouver (WTC-V) is a subsidiary of the Greater Vancouver Board of Trade dedicated to strengthening the export performance of small and medium-sized businesses in British Columbia.

Miscellaneous facts
Over 80% of the Members of the Greater Vancouver Board of Trade are small business owners.
The Greater Vancouver Board of Trade has over 5,000 members.
The Greater Vancouver Board of Trade publishes a monthly newspaper, Sounding Board, which reports on policy issues and membership news, and has an estimated total readership of 30,000.

Current chair

The current chair of the Board of Directors is Brent Cameron, Managing Partner and Chair of the Board, Boyden Canada.

Chairs

See also
Mission Regional Chamber of Commerce

References

World Trade Centers
Chambers of commerce in Canada
Organizations based in Vancouver
Economy of Vancouver